Park Ah-in (born 12 February 1985) is a South Korean actress. She is an alumna of Chung-Ang University, Department of Theater and Film, where she earned a bachelor's degree in Theater Studies. She made her acting debut in 2006 in the horror film Forbidden Floor and since then has appeared in a number of films and television series, including Loner (2008), A Gentleman's Dignity (2012), Descendants of the Sun (2016), Never Twice (2019) and Kkondae Intern (2020).

Early life and marriage
Park was born in Busan, South Korea, and graduated from the Department of Theater and Film at Chung-Ang University. She got married on November 7, 2020, at the Oksu-dong Cathedral in Seongdong-gu, Seoul, her spouse being unrelated to the entertainment industry.

Career
Park started her acting career with the horror film Forbidden Floor in 2006.

In 2008, she took on the role of policewoman Hanakoin in a stage play Atami Murder Case organized by the Chung-Ang University Performing Film Arts Center.

In 2016, she was cast in the award-winning and popular show of the year Descendants of the Sun as Kim Eun-ji, a thoracic surgery specialist. The same year she also appeared in the mystery thriller Babysitter and another award-winning tvN drama The Good Wife.

In 2018, she starred in tvN's historical romance Mr. Sunshine, where she portrayed a woman who is unable to bear a child so she is regularly abused by her husband. The drama was praised by Park Jin-hai of The Korea Times for its strong female characters.

In 2019, she played Lily, an assassin in the spy crime-thriller Vagabond. For her portrayal of an assassin, she was nominated in the Best New Actress category for SBS Drama Awards. In the same year she also portrayed a Korean version of Paris Hilton as the granddaughter of the chairman and founder of Guseong Hotel, where she also is the head of marketing, in MBC's comedy drama Never Twice.

In 2020, Park appeared as Tak Jeong-eun, a 5-year contract worker of the Marketing Department at Joon Soo Foods, in  Kkondae Intern, an MBC TV drama broadcast from May - June, 2020. In the same year she made her first variety show appearance on SBS's comedy show Park-Jang's LOL.

Filmography

Films

Television series

Television variety show

Awards and nominations

References

External links

 

 Park Ah-in on Daum 
 

21st-century South Korean actresses
South Korean film actresses
South Korean television actresses
Living people
1985 births
Chang'an University alumni